The Regional Council of Molise (Italian: Consiglio Regionale del Molise) is the legislative assembly of Molise.

It was first elected in 1970, when the ordinary regions were instituted, on the basis of the Constitution of Italy of 1948.

Composition
The Regional Council of Molise was originally composed of 30 regional councillors. Following the decree-law n. 138 of 13 August 2011, the number of regional councillors was reduced to 20, with an additional seat reserved for the President of the Region.

Political groups
The Regional Council of Molise is currently composed of the following political groups:

See also
Regional council
Politics of Molise
President of Molise

References

External links
Regional Council of Molise

Politics of Molise
Italian Regional Councils
Molise